Sixteen members of the International Council (ICC) fielded teams at the 2004 Under-19 Cricket World Cup in Bangladesh. One team, Uganda, was making its debut.

Australia

Coach:  Bennett King

 Tim Paine (c, wk)
 Ahillen Beadle
 Scott Coyte
 Adam Crosthwaite (wk)
 Theo Doropoulos
 Matthew Harrison
 Moises Henriques
 Cameron Huckett
 Josh Mangan
 Steve O'Keefe
 Lachlan Oswald-Jacobs
 Gary Putland
 Ken Skewes
 Shane Wallace

Source: Rediff

Bangladesh

Coach:  Richard McInnes

 Ashiqur Rahman (c)
 Abul Bashar
 Aftab Ahmed
 Dhiman Ghosh
 Enamul Haque
 Mahmudullah Riyad
 Nadif Chowdhury
 Naeem Islam
 Nafees Iqbal
 Nazimuddin
 Nazmul Hossain
 Rubaiyat Huq (wk)
 Shahadat Hossain
 Talha Jubair

Source: Rediff

Canada

Coach:  Franklyn Dennis

 Umar Bhatti (c)
 Soham Anjaria
 Adam Baksh
 Gavin Bastiampillai
 Trevin Bastiampillai
 Kenneth Carto (wk)
 Karun Jethi
 Aabid Keshvani
 Shaheed Keshvani
 Ryan Lall
 Krunalbhai Patel
 Mohammad Qazi
 Durand Soraine
 Simon Upton

Source: Rediff

England

Coach:  Andy Pick

 Samit Patel (c)
 Ravi Bopara
 Tim Bresnan
 Dan Broadbent
 Alastair Cook
 Steven Davies
 Adam Harrison
 James Hildreth
 Mark Lawson
 Tom New (wk)
 Liam Plunkett
 David Stiff
 Mark Turner
 Luke Wright

Source: Rediff

India

Coach:  Robin Singh
 Ambati Rayudu (c)
 Shikhar Dhawan
 Gaurav Dhiman
 Faiz Fazal
 R K Solanki
 Praveen Gupta
 Dinesh Karthik (wk)
 Suresh Raina
 Nikhil Rathod
 Abhishek Sharma
 R. P. Singh
 Sunny Singh
 V. R. V. Singh
 Robin Uthappa
 Praful Waghela

Source: Rediff

Ireland

Coach:  Adrian Birrell

 William Porterfield (c)
 Peter Blakeney
 Allen Coulter
 Gary Kidd
 Gareth McKee
 Eoin Morgan
 Kevin O'Brien
 John Pryor
 Boyd Rankin
 Robert Rankin
 Andrew Riddles
 Greg Thompson
 Simon Wells
 Gary Wilson (wk)

Source: Rediff

Nepal

Coach:  Roy Dias

 Shakti Gauchan (c)
 Kanishka Chaugai
 Manoj Katuwal
 Sashi Kesari
 Paras Khadka
 Deepesh Khatri
 Lakpa Lama
 Ratan Rauniyar
 Basanta Regmi
 Manjeet Shrestha
 Monick Shrestha
 Raj Shrestha
 Yashwant Subedi
 Sharad Vesawkar

Source: Rediff

New Zealand

Coach:  Dayle Hadlee

 Daniel Bolstad (c)
 Peter Carey
 Liam Chrisp
 Derek de Boorder
 Anton Devcich
 Sean Eathorne
 Brent Findlay
 Daniel Flynn
 Carl Frauenstein
 Sam McKay
 Craig Smith
 BJ Watling (wk)
 Brad Wilson

Source: Rediff

Pakistan

Coach:  Aaqib Javed

 Khalid Latif (c)
 Abid Ali
 Musab Rauf
 Ali Imran
 Asif Iqbal
 Fawad Alam
 Jahangir Mirza
 Mansoor Amjad
 Riaz Afridi
 Salman Qadir
 Tariq Mahmood
 Usman Saeed
 Wahab Riaz
 Zulqarnain Haider (wk)

Source: Rediff

Papua New Guinea

Coach:  Paul Joseph

 Chris Amini (c)
 Kupana Amini
 Kapena Arua
 John Boto
 Mahuru Dai
 Lahui Davai
 John Gavera
 William Harry
 Vivian Kila
 Kila Pala
 Mavara Tamasi
 Assad Vala
 Vali Vali
 Jack Vare

Source: Rediff

Scotland

Coach:  William Morton

 Kyle Coetzer (c)
 Gordon Allan
 Craig Anderson
 Ian Brand
 Robert Cannon
 Kasiam Farid
 Allauddin Farooq
 Gordon Goudie
 Andrew Hislop
 Omer Hussain
 Moneeb Iqbal
 Ross Lyons
 Rajeev Routray
 Ian Young

Source: Rediff

South Africa

Coach:  Russell Domingo

 Divan van Wyk (c)
 Keagan Africa
 Craig Alexander
 Andrew Birch
 Jacob Booysen
 Clint Bowyer
 Francis Nkuna
 Vince Pennazza
 Vernon Philander
 Waylain September
 Mpumelelo Silwana (wk)
 Godfrey Stevens
 Roelof van der Merwe
 Vaughn van Jaarsveld

Source: Rediff

Sri Lanka

Coach:  Somachandra de Silva

 Farveez Maharoof (c)
 Videsh Balasubramaniam
 Manoj Chanaka
 Gihan De Silva (wk)
 Sudheera De Zoysa
 Daminda Kularatne
 Kosala Kulasekara
 Angelo Mathews
 Nadeera Nawela
 Suraj Randiv
 Ganganath Ratnayake
 Kaushal Silva
 Upul Tharanga
 Harsha Vithana

Source: Rediff

Uganda

Coach:  Tom Tikolo

 Hamza Almuzahim (c)
 Davis Arinaitwe
 Fred Isabirye
 Emmanuel Isaneez
 Clive Kyangungu
 Arthur Kyobe
 Dennis Musali
 Patrick Ochan
 Jimmy Okello
 Martin Ondeko
 Raymond Otim
 Danniel Ruyange
 Ronald Ssemanda
 Michael Wambudhe

Source: Rediff

West Indies

Coach:  Clyde Butts

 Denesh Ramdin (c, wk)
 Jonathan Augustus
 Rishi Bachan
 Lionel Baker
 Kirk Edwards
 Assad Fudadin
 Tishan Maraj
 Xavier Marshall
 Mervin Matthew
 Ravi Rampaul
 Liam Sebastien
 Lendl Simmons
 Barrington Yearwood
 Zamal Khan

Source: Rediff

Zimbabwe

Coach:  Walter Chawaguta

 Tino Mawoyo (c)
 James Cameron
 Elton Chigumbura
 Graeme Cremer
 Colin de Grandhomme
 Craig Ervine
 Stanley Marisa
 Tafadzwa Mufambisi
 Tinashe Panyangara
 Ed Rainsford
 Tinashe Ruswa
 Brendan Taylor (wk)
 Prosper Utseya
 Sean Williams

Source: Rediff

Sources
 Team averages, ICC Under-19 World Cup 2003/04 – CricketArchive
 Statistics, ICC Under-19 World Cup 2003/04 – ESPNcricinfo

References

ICC Under-19 Cricket World Cup squads
2004 ICC Under-19 Cricket World Cup